Armen Gevorkyan is an Armenian amateur boxer.

Gevorkyan won a bronze medal at the 1993 European Amateur Boxing Championships in the light welterweight division.

References

Living people
Light-welterweight boxers
Year of birth missing (living people)
Armenian male boxers